Persatuan Sepakbola Indonesia Halmahera Selatan or Persihalsel is an Indonesian football club based in Labuha, Bacan Island, South Halmahera Regency, North Maluku. They currently play in the Liga 3 and their homebase is Gelora Bahrain Kasuba Stadium.

Honours
Liga 3 North Maluku
 Champion: 2021

References

Football clubs in North Maluku
Football clubs in Indonesia
Association football clubs established in 2003
2003 establishments in Indonesia